The 2016 FAI Senior Challenge Cup, also known as the 2016 FAI Irish Daily Mail Senior Cup for sponsorship reasons, was the 96th season of the national Football competition of the Republic of Ireland. The winners of the competition earned a spot in the First qualifying round of the 2017–18 UEFA Europa League.

A total of 40 teams competed in the 2016 competition, which commenced in April 2016. The teams entered from the 2016 League of Ireland
Premier Division and First Division received byes into the second round stage. Four non-league teams also received byes to the second round. The remaining 12 teams entered at the first round stage. These non league teams are composed of the sixteen clubs which reached the fourth round of the 2015–16 FAI Intermediate Cup, and the semi-finalists of the 2015–16 FAI Junior Cup.

Cork City won the cup with a late extra-time goal for a 1-0 win against Dundalk in the final on 6 November.

Teams

First round
The draw for the first round was made on 14 March 2016 at Abbotstown. 20 Non-League teams were included in the draw.

First round Replays

Second round
The draw for the second round was made on 26 April 2016 at the Aviva Stadium. The 20 League of Ireland clubs were entered into this round.

Second round Replays

Third round
The draw for the third round was made on 29 July 2016 in Clonmel.

Quarter-finals
The draw for the Quarter-finals was made on 24 August 2016. RTÉ 2 HD televised the Shamrock Rovers v Cork City game.

Semi-finals
The draw for the semi-finals was made on 13 September 2016 on Morning Ireland on RTÉ Radio 1. RTÉ 2 HD televised both games.

Semi-final replays

Final

References

 
FAI Cup seasons